Carlos A. Ball (born 1964) is an American law professor and author. He is a distinguished professor of law at Rutgers Law School. Ball is the author of several books on the subjects of LGBT rights, the First Amendment, and Constitutional law.

Education 
Ball completed a bachelor of arts in political science and history, summa cum laude, at Tufts University in 1986. He was inducted into Phi Beta Kappa. He earned a J.D. from Columbia Law School in 1990 and a LL.M. from University of Cambridge in 1995.

Career 
Ball was a clerk for the Massachusetts Supreme Judicial Court from 1990 to 1991. He worked for the Legal Aid Society as a criminal defense attorney from 1991 to 1993. Ball was served as legal council for HIV and Tuberculosis policy for the New York City Department of Health and Mental Hygiene from 1993 to 1994. He taught at University of Illinois College of Law and Penn State Law where he was a professor of law and the Weiss Family Distinguished Faculty Scholar. In 2008, Ball joined the faculty at Rutgers Law School as a professor of law and Judge Frederick Lacey Scholar. In July 2013, he became a distinguished professor of law at Rutgers. His work focuses on LGBT rights issues. He teaches courses on sexuality and gender identity law, the First Amendment, and Constitutional law.

Personal life 
Ball has a son and a daughter with his husband .

Selected works

Books

References 

Living people
1964 births
Rutgers School of Law–Newark faculty
Tufts University School of Arts and Sciences alumni
Columbia Law School alumni
Alumni of the University of Cambridge
Pennsylvania State University faculty
University of Illinois faculty
American LGBT writers
LGBT academics
LGBT lawyers
20th-century American lawyers
21st-century American lawyers
20th-century American male writers
21st-century American male writers
20th-century American non-fiction writers
21st-century American non-fiction writers
21st-century American LGBT people